Vincent Lukáč (born 14 February 1954 in Košice, Czechoslovakia) is a former professional Slovak ice hockey player.

He was a player of HC Košice (the most successful player in history of the team - 14 seasons, 518 games, 393 goals), HC Dukla Jihlava, SC Rosenheim, WEV Wien, Kirkcaldy, Streatham Redskins in London and Fife Flyers of Scotland. He was drafted by the Quebec Nordiques in 1985 (in the age of 31), but he never played the NHL.

He was a coach of HC Košice, the Slovak national ice hockey team and MsHK Žilina, Slovakia.

Vincent Lukáč is living in Košice, Slovakia. He is a father-in-law of Jiří Bicek. In 2004, he was inducted into the Slovak Hockey Hall of Fame.

Outside of ice hockey, he contested Let's Dance.

Career statistics

Regular season and playoffs

International

External links
 Vincent Lukáč in the Slovak Hockey Hall of Fame

1954 births
Living people
Czechoslovak ice hockey left wingers
Fife Flyers players
HC Košice players
HC Dukla Jihlava players
Ice hockey players at the 1980 Winter Olympics
Ice hockey players at the 1984 Winter Olympics
Olympic ice hockey players of Czechoslovakia
Olympic medalists in ice hockey
Olympic silver medalists for Czechoslovakia
Sportspeople from Košice
Quebec Nordiques draft picks
Slovak ice hockey left wingers
Slovak ice hockey coaches
Medalists at the 1984 Winter Olympics
Czechoslovak expatriate sportspeople in Scotland
Czechoslovak expatriate sportspeople in England
Czechoslovak expatriate sportspeople in Austria
Czechoslovak expatriate sportspeople in Germany
Czechoslovak expatriate ice hockey people
Expatriate ice hockey players in Austria
Expatriate ice hockey players in Scotland
Expatriate ice hockey players in England
Expatriate ice hockey players in Germany